The 2007–08 A1 Grand Prix of Nations, Malaysia is an A1 Grand Prix race, to be held on November 25, 2007, at the Sepang International Circuit in Sepang, Malaysia. This will be the third meeting in the 2007-08 A1 Grand Prix season and the 50th start in the A1 Grand Prix history.

Pre-race 
Swiss driver Rahel Frey was the second ever woman to enter in A1GP weekend, on Friday, during rookies sessions. Her compatriot Natacha Gachnang drove the rookies sessions in Czech round also in 2007.

Qualifications 
Neel Jani clocked the best lap time of the weekend in the sprint race qualifications and improve this in the main race qualifications in 1'47.648. Swiss driver demonstrate his superiority in the Sepang circuit and take a double pole for Sunday races.

The Lebanese cars was found to be under the minimum weight limit during main race qualifying. A1 Team Lebanon start from the back of the grid (22nd), instead of 18th, because of the Chris Alajajian car was found 3 kg under the 705 kg minimum weight limit.

Sprint race 
At the start of the sprint race, conditions were warm and humid, with the temperature being 29 °C and the humidity level at 78%. Canada's Robert Wickens lost one position at turn one, while Great Britain's Oliver Jarvis and France's Loïc Duval collided. The British driver was forced back to 6th with damage to the front wing of his car. Still on the first lap, China's Cong Fu Cheng was hit by New Zealand's Jonny Reid, losing many positions as a result. Alex Yoong, driver for the Malaysian team, experienced the best opening lap, moving up from 19th to 11th.

On lap 3, Cong Fu Cheng (China) retired from the race, stopped at the side of the track. Jonny Reid (New Zealand) took over 6th from Oliver Jarvis (Great Britain) after passing on the front straight on lap 5. On the next lap, Jeroen Bleekemolen (Netherlands) passed Adam Carroll (Ireland) for 8th.

On the final lap, Michael Ammermüller (Germany) collided with Wickens (Canada) at turn two, overtaking for the final spot on the podium. Switzerland took the checkered flag, winning the race and securing the fastest lap, followed by France and Germany. Neel Jani dominated from start to finish, achieving pole, the fastest lap (1'49.221) and victory.

Jeroen Bleekemolen was found to have jumped the rolling start, with stewards handing down a penalty of 25 seconds (the equivalent time loss to a drive-through penalty) after the end of the race. The result moved them from 8th to 18th position, taking away the three points they had originally scored.

Germany's collision with Canada on the final lap was deemed avoidable, and the team was demoted from 3rd to 16th place as a consequence.

Both of these demotions promoted Yoong to 9th, giving Malaysia their first two points of the season. Ammermüller's penalty also allowed Wickens to finish on the podium in 3rd.

Main race 
There is 32 °C and 66% of humidity for the second start of the Malaysian round. The two mandatories pit stop should occur between 8th and 14th laps and between 22nd and 30th laps.
At the first corner, a collision get involve Canada, USA, Portugal, China, Australia and Czech Republic. The Portuguese car stuck in the gravel. After a great start jumping ninth, Malaysia and New Zealand collide in the second lap. Then both team must pass by stand. Robert Wickens (Canada) hits Adrian Zaugg (South Africa) while he tried to get his car back on track after spins out on lap 8, turn seven. Then both driver retire and the safety car is out.
Meanwhile, Malaysia and New Zealand can catch up the end of the file after their collide on lap 2. The pit stop window is open and cars were stationary at the end of the pit lane with red light. On green light, Brazil got the better start behind Switzerland, Great Britain, France, Germany and Netherlands. The safety car go back and the race restart on lap 12. Oliver Jarvis (Great Britain) passes Neel Jani (Switzerland) into the second corner but the Swiss driver go by Jarvis and Loïc Duval sneaks by too. In lap 14, Brazil set the fastest lap. Switzerland catch up Brazil, New Zealand attempt to passes Pakistan but is well defending, Ireland make mistake and drops from seventh to 10th.
In lap 18, Enrico Toccacelo (Italy) is in the pit and renounce. In turn 2, lap 20, German rookie driver, Michael Ammermüller hit unfairly Great Britain and drops to 5th, Jarvis is now 6th. Germany receive a drive-through penalty. For lap 23, the pit lane is open for the second stops. Jeroen Bleekemolen (Netherlands) passes Loïc Duval (France) for 2nd place. In lap 25, Great Britain take the fast lap just before is pit stop where is too fast in the pit lane and receive a drive-through penalty. Switzerland set the fast lap at its turn. Again, at turn 2, lap 29, Michael Ammermüller collide unfairly Erik Janis (Czech Republic) and passes.
After second mandatory pit stop closed, Switzerland is behind Brazil and France. Mexico, Great Britain, USA and Australia are still battling for position. Great Britain gets by Mexico in lap 34 and Ian Dyk (Australia) passes Jonathan Summerton (USA) in final lap. Oliver Jarvis drops USA too.
The final top ten was: Switzerland, Brazil, France, Netherlands, China, India, Ireland, New Zealand, Australia and Great Britain.

After the race, A1 teams Brazil and Great Britain were penalised to stay stationary at a red light during safety-car period on at the pit exit after their first mandatory pit stops. Both teams have been retrogressed of 2 seconds to their total race time. Brazilian team lose one position (2nd to 3rd) and Great Britain lose 2 positions (10th to 12th) in their final feature race results.

Germany, with its driver Michael Ammermüller, was excluded from the final main race results. In lap 19, the German team cause an avoidable collision with Great Britain and was sanctioned with a drive-through penalty but in lap 28, Germany reiterate an avoidable collision with Czech Republic. The final results before exclusion of Germany was 13th.

Neel Jani accomplish the perfect weekend with 2 pole positions, 2 wins and 2 fast laps.

Notes 
 Main race was the 50th start and 25th race weekend.
 It was the first race for Michael Ammermüller and Robert Wickens in A1 Grand Prix.
 It was the first race weekend for Michael Ammermüller, Earl Bamber, Rahel Frey and Edoardo Piscopo.
 It was the 3rd venue in the Sepang International Circuit and the 3rd Malaysian Grand Prix.
 Records :
 A1 Team Lebanon participate on 25 races (50 starts) without won points since their first Grand Prix.
 26th podium for A1 Team France.
 Alex Yoong participate on 24 races (46 starts).
 Neel Jani won 201 points.

References

External links 
Switzerland takes Sprint race
Sepang Sprint: lap by lap
 Sprint race results
Switzerland wins thrilling Feature
Sepang Feature: lap by lap
Feature race results

A1 Grand Prix Of Nations, Malaysia, 2007-08
A1 Grand Prix